Manuel Joaquim Martins, usually known as Manuel Martins (October 24, 1911 – 1979) was a Brazilian artist that worked with painting, illustration, drawing, engraving, sculpture and embroidery.

Martins was born and died in São Paulo.  The son of Portuguese immigrants, he grew up in the industrial suburb of Brás. In 1924, he started to work in embroidery. Started in 1931 artistic studies with the sculptor  Vicente Larocca. Then he watched classes in Escola de Belas Artes de São Paulo. He joined the Santa Helena Group in 1935. The group included Alfredo Volpi, Francisco Rebolo and Fulvio Pennacchi, among others. He shared atelier with Mario Zanini. In 1937 he showed his works of the  Família Artística Paulista, also known as FAP.

During the 60s, he started engraving metal. Parallel to his painting he worked as a book illustrator, as well as a magazine illustrator, working for "O cortiço" and "Bahia de Todos os Santos".

His works convey themes of social concern, including social classes and working life. He classically painted São Paulo landscaped which were treated by the media as examples of "life-reporting".

External links
  Artfacts.Net: Manuel Joaquim Martins in artfacts.net: le guide international de galeries d'art moderne et d'art contemporain
 Martins, Manoel in Encyclopaedia Itaú Cultural of Visual Arts
  Manuel Martins in Arte e Pintura Brasileira

1911 births
1979 deaths
Modern artists
Brazilian people of Portuguese descent
20th-century Brazilian painters
20th-century Brazilian male artists
Brazilian embroiderers